The Valley of Hell is a 1927 American silent Western film directed by Clifford Smith.

Only 2 reels survive of this film at George Eastman House.

Plot
In the Old West, a dashing hero saves a girl from bandits.

Cast
 Francis McDonald - Creighton Steele 
 Edna Murphy - Mary Calvert 
 William Steele - James Brady

References

External links
 
 AllMovie.com

1927 films
Metro-Goldwyn-Mayer films
American black-and-white films
1927 Western (genre) films
Lost Western (genre) films
Lost American films
Films directed by Clifford Smith
1927 lost films
Silent American Western (genre) films
1920s American films